Marcy Dermansky (born 1969) is an American  author and editor.  Her  debut novel Twins was published in 2005 by William Morrow. Bad Marie, her second novel, was published in 2010 by Harper Perennial. Her third novel The Red Car was published by Liveright in 2016. The book was named a Best Book of the Year by Buzzfeed, The San Francisco Chronicle, Flavorwire, and The Huffington Post. It was a New York Times Editors Choice Pick. Her fourth novel Very Nice published by Knopf, was released on July 2, 2019. Her fifth novel Hurricane Girl , a thriller, published by Penguin Random House was released on June 14, 2022.

Dermansky received fellowships from MacDowell and the Edward Albee Ranch. She is the winner of the 2002 Smallmouth Press Andre Dubus Novella Award, and the 1999 Story Magazine Carson McCullers short story prize. Her stories have been published in numerous literary journals, including McSweeneys, The Alaska Quarterly Review, and The Indiana Review, and included in the anthology "Goodybye to All That: Writers On Loving And Leaving New York" and  Love Stories: A Literary Companion to Tennis.

References

External links
 Marcy Dermansky's Website
 Marcy's Movie Reviews on Rotten Tomatoes
 Twins at HarperCollins
 Bad Marie at HarperCollins
 Self-Interview with Marcy at The Nervous Breakdown
 Bad Marie in Time Magazine
 Review of 'Bad Marie' on The Nervous Breakdown
 Interview on LitKicks
 NPR interview

1969 births
Living people
American women journalists
21st-century American novelists
People from New Jersey
Writers from Queens, New York
American film critics
American women novelists
American women film critics
21st-century American women writers
Journalists from New York City
Novelists from New York (state)
21st-century American non-fiction writers